Sust 'n' Able is the Woodcraft Folk's programme of education for sustainable development.

The project was the theme of the Woodcraft Folk's 2001 international camp in Nottinghamshire where 4,000 young people attended. The camp focused on sustainable development education and ran activates for children from five to twenty five around the themes.

At the camp a simulation game took place called 'World on a Tight Rope'. The game ran for the duration of the camp and involved people working for credits to create a more sustainable world. The simulation included two 'Earth Summits' held at the camp to come up with a declaration to the world's leaders at the World Summit on Sustainable Development (WSSD). The Earth Summit had "action stations" where people debated the issues to be included in the declaration.

The declaration and delegation

The Declaration created as part of the simulation game was presented by a delegation of 11 young people. The delegation attended the United Nations' World Summit on Sustainable Development including both the civil society and the official political areas of the summit. The group worked with the International Falcon Movement - Socialist Education International delegation attending the summit.

Delegations from Woodcraft Folk attend all the Commission on Sustainable Development meetings in New York City which are follow-up meetings to the annual WSSD, with thematic cycles changing every two years.

External links

References

The Woodcraft Folk
Co-operatives in the United Kingdom
2001 establishments in the United Kingdom
Sustainable development
Sustainability in the United Kingdom